Mono Village, California may refer to:
Mono Village, Mono County, California
Mono Village, Tuolumne County, California